Angelcorpse was a blackened death metal band formed after the demise of Pete Helmkamp's previous band, Order from Chaos. Originally from Kansas City, Missouri, they relocated to Tampa, Florida.

History
They formed in 1995, with a line-up of Helmkamp, guitarist Gene Palubicki, and drummer John Longstreth, and recorded a demo, Goats to Azazael, which led to a contract with Osmose Productions. The band's debut album, Hammer of Gods, was released in 1996, after which rhythm guitarist Bill Taylor joined, playing on second album Exterminate (1998). Drummer Tony Laureano joined shortly after its release but Taylor left. The band's third album, The Inexorable, was released in the fall of 1999, after which Taylor rejoined. While on tour with Immortal, Satyricon, and Krisiun, in support of The Inexorable, the band had an accident in their tour van, in which Helmkamp was injured. On the same tour, Helmkamp's girlfriend was stabbed, and he decided to leave the band. The rest of the band continued for a while but decided to split up. 

In 2006, the band reformed and recorded a new album. Helmkamp said of the reunion: "It just seems like the planets realigned. It's not like we didn't get along or that there were any bridges to mend."

Their lyrical themes are generally concerned with warfare. The band has been involved in a number of American and European tours involving other metal acts such as Immortal, Krisiun, Cianide, and Watain. An East Coast USA tour was completed in May 2007. In 2008 the band embarked on a larger European tour with Revenge and Arkhon Infaustus throughout Europe, this tour included a performance at the United Metal Maniacs Open Air Festival in Bitterfeld Germany. Upon returning to the US, live dates on the West Coast with Cemetery Urn, Sanguis Imperum, Gospel of the Horns, and Ares Kingdom were completed. On April 7, 2009, the members announced disbandment, citing "musical differences" as the reason.

Helmkamp claimed that the band is fueled by "the constant struggle, strife, camaraderie, and unified will that forged the iron, blood, and blasphemy of our music and lyrics".

As of 2015, the band temporarily reformed for select live dates, though it was repeatedly stressed that it was a one-time live reunion that would not produce new material. Upon concluding their reunion live dates in 2017, the band split up permanently.

Discography
 Goats to Azazel (demo, 1995)
 Hammer of Gods (1996)
 Nuclear Hell (EP, 1997)
 Wolflust (single, 1997)
 Exterminate (1998)
 Winds of Desecration (EP, split with Martire, 1999)
 The Inexorable (1999)
 Iron, Blood and Blasphemy (compilation of singles, EPs, live songs and original demo, 2000)
 Death Dragons of the Apocalypse (live CD, 2002)
 Of Lucifer and Lightning (2007)

While Angelcorpse's main material is released on Osmose, the singles, EPs, and live albums were released on Gene Palubicki's Evil Vengeance Records.

Members

Final lineup
 Pete Helmkamp – bass, vocals (1995–2000, 2006–2009, 2015–2017)
 Gene Palubicki – guitar (1995–2000, 2006–2009, 2015–2017)
 Andrea Janko – drums (2016–2017)

Former members
 Tony Laureano – drums (1998–2000)
 Bill Taylor – guitar (1996–1998, 1999-2000)
 John Longstreth – drums (1995–1998, 2006–2007)
 Paul Collier – drums (2008)
 Terry "Warhead" – drums (2008–2009)
 Ronnie Parmer – drums (2015–2016)
 Ken Phillips – guitar (1999)

Timeline

References

External links

 Old official website (Archived 2009-10-25)
 Official Angelcorpse @ Myspace
 Live Angel Corpse Reviews

Death metal musical groups from Florida
Heavy metal musical groups from Missouri
Musical groups established in 1995
Musical groups disestablished in 2000
Musical groups reestablished in 2006
Musical groups disestablished in 2009
American black metal musical groups
Blackened death metal musical groups
American musical trios
Musical groups from Kansas City, Missouri